von Otter is a Swedish noble family. People with that name include:

 Anne Sofie von Otter (born 1955), Swedish opera singer
 Birgitta von Otter (born 1939), Swedish writer and journalist
 Fredrik von Otter (1833–1910), Swedish naval officer and prime minister
 Göran von Otter (1907–1988), Swedish diplomat

Surnames of Swedish origin